Fagacarus is a genus of mites in the family Acaridae. It contains a single described species, and at least two undescribed species. Fagacarus species feed on fungi in decaying wood.

References

Acaridae
Monotypic arachnid genera